The 2009 Copa Colombia football tournament, officially the 2009 Copa Postobón for sponsorship reasons, was the seventh edition of the Copa Colombia, the national football cup competition for clubs of Colombia's DIMAYOR league. It began on March 4 and ended on November 18. Santa Fe won the tournament for their 2nd title.

Format
The format for 2009 remains the same as last year's. The winner of will earn a berth in the 2010 Copa Sudamericana.

Phase I

Group A 
Group A comprises teams from the Caribbean Region.

Group B 
Group B comprises teams from the Paisa Region.

Group C 
Group C comprises teams from Santander, Norte de Santander, and Boyacá.

Group D 
Group D comprises teams from Bogotá and Villavicencio.

Group E 
Group E comprises teams from the Pacific Region.

Group F 
Group F comprises teams from Cundinamarca and the western part of the country.

Phase II
Phase II began on August 26 and ended on September 2. Team #2 played the second leg at home.

|}

Phase III
Phase III began on September 16 and ended on September 23. Team #2 played the second leg at home.

|}

Semifinals
The semifinals began on October 28 and ended on November 4. Team #2 played the second leg at home.

|}

Finals
The finals was played on November 11 and November 18. Team #2 played the second leg at home.

Top goalscorers

See also
Copa Colombia
DIMAYOR

References

External links 
Official website of DIMAYOR 
2009 Copa Colombia on RSSSF

2009
Copa Colombia
Colombia